Llandegla Forest is a forest of planted conifers covering 2.5 sq miles (6.5 km2) in Denbighshire, north-east Wales. It is situated to the south-east of the village of Llandegla at the north-western edge of Ruabon Moors. Only 20 miles from the city of Chester and 7 miles west of Wrexham, easily accessed via the A525 towards Ruthin.The forest is owned by UPM Tilhill and planting began in the early 1970s. The trees are mostly Sitka Spruce with a smaller area of larch.

In the middle of the forest lies Pendinas Reservoir. It was constructed in the late 19th century by Brymbo Water Company to provide water for the local area. It is currently managed by Dee Valley Water.

The forest is used for a range of recreational activities including mountain-biking and walking. The Offa's Dyke Path, a long-distance footpath, passes through the forest. Fishing activity takes place at the reservoir.

The forest and adjacent moorland are important habitats for the Black Grouse which is declining in many parts of England and Wales. The birds are increasing here due to a programme of special land management. A bird hide has been constructed overlooking the birds' lekking to allow visitors to watch them.

References
Llandegla Millennium Action Group (2003) Llandegla Then and Now, Llandegla Millennium Action Group, Llandegla.

External links
Coed Llandegla website

 

Forests and woodlands of Denbighshire
Geography of Denbighshire
Tourist attractions in Denbighshire